SAP IS-U is SAP's Industry-Specific Solution for the Utilities Industry. SAP IS-U is a sales and information system that supports utility and waste disposal companies.

SAP IS-U supports business functions such as meter reading, meter data management, scheduling, billing, invoicing, accounting, customer service, and integration to customer relations management. This component can manage and bill customers who receive services, purchase goods, or pay fees and taxes.

SAP IS-U helps electric, gas, and water utilities of all sizes in regulated, transitioning or deregulated markets. It offers management of business processes to help utilities gain visibility for better decision-making and responsiveness to market demands. SAP IS-U is an integrated component of SAP enterprise software, and uses functions of the mySAP standard components FI, CO, AM, SD, PM/SM, and MM. SAP IS-U.

References

Further reading

External links 
Official SAP for Utilities User Group on SAP Community Network (Implementation, Forum, Solution Map, Wiki)
SAP Library - SAP Utilities SAP Library - SAP Utilities

SAP Utilities 
SAP IS Utilities ebooks

SAP E-Books 
The biggest SAP forum

IS-U